Abdurrazack "Zackie" Achmat (born 21 March 1962) is a South African activist and film director. He is a co-founder the Treatment Action Campaign and known worldwide for his activism on behalf of people living with HIV and AIDS in South Africa. He currently serves as board member and co-director of Ndifuna Ukwazi (Dare to Know), an organisation which aims to build and support social justice organisations and leaders, and is the chairperson of Equal Education.

Early life and education
Achmat was born in the Johannesburg suburb of Vrededorp to a Muslim Cape Malay family and grew up in the Cape Coloured community in Salt River during apartheid. He was raised by his mother and his aunt who were both shop stewards for the Garment Workers Union.

He did not matriculate but nevertheless graduated with a BA Hons degree in English literature from the University of the Western Cape in 1992 and studied filmmaking at the Cape Town Film School.

Political activism
Achmat set fire to his school in Salt River in support of the 1976 student protests and was imprisoned several times during his youth for political activities. He joined the African National Congress (ANC) in 1980 while serving time in prison. Between 1985 and 1990 he was a member of the Marxist Workers Tendency of the ANC, a Trotskyist breakaway group of the ANC and precursor to the Democratic Socialist Movement.

Achmat describes his political ideology as democratic socialist since the unbanning of the ANC in 1990. Despite being a member of the ANC, he vigorously opposed the HIV/AIDS denialism promoted by former President Thabo Mbeki and other senior ANC members and in 2004 he withdrew his ANC membership under Mbeki's leadership. In 2006, Achmat called on fellow party members to formulate appropriate HIV policies and oust Health Minister Manto Tshabalala-Msimang. He has also been outspoken in his criticism of President Jacob Zuma and ANC corruption.

LGBT rights activism
Achmat co-founded the National Coalition for Gay and Lesbian Equality in 1994, and as its director he ensured protections for gays and lesbians in the new South African Constitution, and facilitated the prosecution of cases that led to the decriminalisation of sodomy and granting of equal status to same-sex partners in the immigration process. Achmat wrote a much-cited article about sexuality in South African prisons, based on his personal experiences.

HIV/AIDS activism

Before co-founding the Treatment Action Campaign (TAC) in 1998, Achmat was a director of the AIDS Law Project based out of the University of the Witwatersrand, which is now headed by Achmat's longtime collaborator Mark Heywood. The AIDS Law Project and TAC work closely together in all the legal matters that arise in the course of advocating for the right to health, including prosecuting cases and defending TAC volunteers.

Solidarity with people living with HIV and AIDS in South Africa
Achmat publicly announced his HIV-positive status in 1998 and refused to take antiretroviral drugs until all who needed them had access to them. He held firm in his pledge until August 2003 when a national congress of TAC activists voted to urge him to begin antiretroviral treatment. He finally announced that he would start treatment shortly before the government announced that it would make antiretrovirals available in the public sector.

Westville Prison incident
Achmat was one of 44 TAC activists arrested in 2006 for occupying provincial government offices in Cape Town as a protest in order to call for Health Minister Manto Tshabalala-Msimang and Correctional Services Minister Ngconde Balfour to be charged with culpable homicide for the death of an HIV-positive inmate at Westville Prison in Durban. The protesters were charged with trespassing and ordered to appear before court. The inmate was one of 15 prisoners who were plaintiffs in a case against the Departments of Health and Correctional Services, suing to be provided access to antiretroviral drugs. The court ordered the government to provide the drugs immediately.

Social justice activism
In 2008, Achmat co-founded the Social Justice Coalition (SJC), an organisation with the aim of promoting the rights enshrined in South Africa's Constitution, particularly among poor and unemployed people living in the country. In 2009 he co-founded the Centre for Law and Social Justice, subsequently renamed Ndifuna Ukwazi (Dare to Know), with Gavin Silber.

In 2013, Achmat and 18 other SJC activists were arrested for an illegal gathering outside the Cape Town Civic Centre, where they were protesting about sanitation services in the township of Khayelitsha.

Allegations of sexual harassment cover up
In 2018, Achmat was accused of intimidating women against speaking about sexual harassment while he was the chair of the board of Equal Education, specifically regarding allegations against Doron Isaacs. Achmat has denied the claims, while also publicly defending Isaacs, stating that he does not believe Isaacs is a sexual predator.

After receiving public criticism, Achmat joined calls for a public inquiry into Equal Education's handling of allegations of sexual misconduct in the organisation. Equal Education appointed retired judge Kathleen Satchwell to head an inquiry into the allegations. The Satchwell inquiry found that the allegations against Achmat and Isaacs were baseless. However, one member of Satchwell's three person inquiry dissented on the basis that she wished to take into considerations the anonymous allegations that were initially rejected by Satchwell due to concerns regarding fairness. There were a total of 19 submissions done and verified through the Women's Legal Centre that were rejected by the commission.

Personal life
Achmat was diagnosed HIV-positive in 1990. In 2005 he had a heart attack, which his doctor said was unlikely to be caused by his HIV-positive status or treatment. He recovered sufficiently to return to his activism work.

On 5 January 2008, Achmat married his partner and fellow activist Dalli Weyers at a ceremony in the Cape Town suburb of Lakeside. The ceremony was attended by then Mayor Helen Zille and presided over by Supreme Court of Appeal judge Edwin Cameron. The couple divorced amicably in June 2011.

Media
Achmat's story is one of the 28 stories featured in the 2007 nonfiction book 28: Stories of AIDS in Africa by Stephanie Nolen.
Achmat is portrayed as a "Saint" in the 2009 video opera Fig Trees.
Achmat's critical role in the battle for mass antiretroviral treatment in Africa is portrayed in the award-winning 2013 documentary film Fire in the Blood.

Filmography

Directing
Apostles of Civilised Vice (2000) – documentary about homosexuality in South Africa
Law and Freedom (2005) – two-part documentary about landmark court cases in South Africa

Acting (as himself)
 Jonathan Dimbleby: The AIDS Crisis in Africa (2002) – presented by Jonathan Dimbleby
 Kommt Europa in die Hölle? (English: Is Europe Going to Hell?) – directed by Robert Cibis (2004)
 Darling! The Pieter-Dirk Uys Story (2007) – BFI award-winning documentary about Pieter-Dirk Uys directed by Julian Shaw
 Road to Ingwavuma (2008)
  Fig Trees (2009)
 Fire in the Blood (2013)

Recognition and awards
2001 – Desmond Tutu Leadership Award
2001 – People in Need's Homo Homini Award for human rights activism
2003 – National Press Club (South Africa) Newsmaker of the Year
2003 – Jonathan Mann Award for Global Health and Human Rights
2003 – Nelson Mandela Health and Human Rights Award
2003 – Elected an Ashoka Fellow
2003 – Named one of Time'''s 2003 European Heroes
2004 – Voted 61st in SABC3's list of 100 Great South Africans''
2004 – Nominated for the Nobel Peace Prize by the Quaker humanitarian group American Friends Service Committee
2009 – Awarded Open Society Fellowship
2011 – City of Cape Town Civic Honours

References

External links
 

1962 births
Living people
People from Johannesburg
People from Cape Town
South African people of Malay descent
HIV/AIDS activists
People with HIV/AIDS
South African LGBT people
South African LGBT rights activists
South African activists
South African atheists
South African former Muslims
South African Trotskyists
University of the Western Cape alumni
Ashoka South Africa Fellows
Members of the African National Congress
South African film directors
Former Muslims turned agnostics or atheists